Great Givendale is a hamlet in the East Riding of Yorkshire, England.

Great Givendale forms part of the civil parish of Millington.

The church, dedicated to Saint Ethelburgh, was designated a Grade II* listed building in 1967 and is now recorded in the National Heritage List for England, maintained by Historic England.

The Minster Way and Chalkland Way long-distance footpaths pass through the main street of the village.

There is also a scout camp located near the hamlet, which is a green field campsite.

In 1823 Great Givendale was a village and civil parish, in the  Wapentake of Harthill and the Liberty of St Peter's, that included the settlement of Little Givendale. The church was under the patronage of the Dean of York. Parish population at the time was 60, which included four farmers and a gentleman.

References

External links

Villages in the East Riding of Yorkshire